Alicia Haber (born 21 October 1946) is a Uruguayan historian, art critic, curator, and teacher.

Biography
She was an art critic at the newspaper El País between 1982 and 2009. She has been director of the Virtual Museum of Arts (MUVA) of El País since its formation in 1996.

She has curated numerous exhibition projects for museums and cultural centers in her country and abroad. She was curator of the Uruguayan submission to the Biennial of Cuenca in 2001, and in 2005 was curator of Lacy Duarte's exhibition at the Venice Biennale. She is the author of numerous monographs and critical texts for publications, catalogs, and art books.

Books
 Luis A. Solari: Máscaras todo el año, Editorial Linardi y Risso, Montevideo, 2003. 
 José Gurvich: Murales, esculturas y objetos, Fundación Gurvich, Montevideo, 2003. 
 José Gurvich: Un canto a la vida, 1997.  
 Tola Invernizzi: el tiempo en que el arte se enfureció, Ed. Trilce, Montevideo, 2007.

References

1946 births
Living people
20th-century Uruguayan historians
21st-century Uruguayan historians
Art curators
Uruguayan art critics
Uruguayan curators
Uruguayan educators
Uruguayan women curators
Uruguayan women educators
Women art critics
Women art historians